Terry L. Punt (August 13, 1949 – December 27, 2009) was a Republican member of the Pennsylvania State Senate, representing the 33rd District from 1989 to 2008. He also previously served as a member of the Pennsylvania House of Representatives from 1979 to 1988. He served in the United States Army from 1967 to 1970.

References

External links
Pennsylvania Senate - Terry Punt Official PA Senate Website (archived)
Biography, voting record, and interest group ratings at Project Vote Smart

1949 births
2009 deaths
Republican Party Pennsylvania state senators
Republican Party members of the Pennsylvania House of Representatives
United States Army soldiers
United Church of Christ members
People from Waynesboro, Pennsylvania
20th-century American politicians